Isoglutamine or α-glutamine is a gamma amino acid derived from glutamic acid by substituting the carboxyl group in position 1 with an amide group. This is in contrast to the proteinogenic amino acid glutamine, which is the 5-amide of glutamic acid.

Isoglutamine can form the C-terminus of a peptide chain, as in muramyl dipeptide (MDP), a constituent of bacterial cell walls. It can also occur inside a peptide chain, in which case the chain is continued at the carboxyl group and isoglutamine behaves as a γ-amino acid, as in mifamurtide, a synthetic derivative of MDP used to treat osteosarcoma.

Stereochemistry
Substituting -glutamic acid, the proteinogenic enantiomer, gives -isoglutamine, which has S configuration. -Isoglutamine, the derivative of the nonproteinogenic -glutamic acid, has R configuration. The latter is the form occurring in MDP and mifamurtide.

References

Amino acids